Senior captain is a rank which is used in some countries' armed forces, navies, merchant marines, civil aviation and in the airline industry.

Army
In some armies of the world, the senior captain is a rank between a regular captain and a major. The rank is often only found in armies and air forces. A similar position to that of navy senior captain is the rank of senior colonel.

Asian armies
However, the ranks and insignia derive from the practice of the Soviet Army, which has, like the Red Army before it and the Russian Army today, four company-grade officer ranks, one captain rank and three lieutenant ranks. The literal translation of those four ranks in Chinese are junior(-grade) officer, mid(-grade) officer, upper(-grade) officer, and senior(-grade) officer. Since the PLA today uses only three-company grade officer ranks, it has become conventional to translate  which originally corresponded to the Soviet rank of senior lieutenant, as captain, and hence , which corresponded to the Soviet rank of captain, as senior captain. The corresponding fourth junior office rank of the Vietnamese Army, is usually translated as captain.

In the Afghan National Army and the Afghan National Police, between the ranks of turan (captain) and Jagran (major) is the rank of jag turan.  In the case of the Afghan National Police, the rank of jag turan is most commonly translated as "staff captain".

European armies

In the Czechoslovak Army (and the Czechoslovak People's Army) until 1954, the rank of štábní kapitán (staff captain) was the equivalent rank.

Historically, the British Army used the title of First Captain to identify the company commander in each regiment who was senior to the other company commanders.

Serbian Armed Forces are using rank of Senior captain since 1860. The rank was used by the Royal Serbian Army and Royal Yugoslav Army until 1945. The new communist government has reintroduced rank of Senior captain in 1952 for Yugoslav People's Army. It was used in Armed Forces of Serbia and Montenegro until 2006. In December 2019 Ministry of Defence has decided to reintroduce rank of Senior captain into Serbian Armed Forces.

Senior captain's insignia

Navy
In some countries of the world, there is the notion of a senior captain, abbreviation " Sr. CAPT " or " Snr CAPT " . Sometimes, this is also called or indicated as commodore or flotilla captain.  When similar rank existed in Imperial Russian Navy it was called not commodore, but rather captain-commander. A naval senior captain is similar to the army's senior colonel rank or in a few cases to army's brigadier general.

Merchant marine or merchant navy
In some merchant marines or merchant navies of the world, some shipmasters, with particular and recognized seniority in terms of true and effective ocean-going ships'command, they are indicated with the title of senior captain; moreover, in accordance with ancient maritime traditions, they are referred to as commodore, abbreviated in Cmde or also CMDE. The most senior captain, among others senior captains, he will be named first senior captain or, in accordance with maritime traditions referred to as commodore 1st class abbreviated in Codre or also CDRE.
senior captain, abbreviation will be "Sr. CAPT" or "Snr CAPT".

Civil aviation and in the airline industry 
In civil aviation, the position of "senior captain" is an employment, contractual position, corresponding to the maximum achievable level, for the "captain"  of both fixed-wing and rotary-wing civil aviation aircraft, dependent on particular seniority requirements. It is followed in descending order by the "first captain". The "senior captain", in the airline industry carry out, while on the ground, coordination work in the organization of the shifts and the service of the air-navigation personnel. The title, the rank of senior captain, is deontologically, hierarchically and contractually protected, therefore, it is not allowed to use this honorific title and rank without having a legitimate title. "Senior captain", abbreviation will be " Sr. CAPT" or "Snr CAPT".

United States Revenue Cutter Service
The rank of senior captain was used by the Revenue Cutter Service to denote a rank equivalent to a U.S. Navy commander and was established in 1908 during an overhaul of service rank structures by Congress. The rank and title of captain-commandant denoted the head of the Revenue Cutter Service and was superior to the rank of senior captain. The captain-commandant was equivalent in rank to a navy captain. A Revenue Cutter Service captain was equivalent to a navy lieutenant commander at the time.

Notes

Citations

References cited

 
 

Military ranks